Streetcars in San Diego may refer to:
 San Diego Electric Railway, the former streetcar system
 San Diego Trolley, the modern light rail system in San Diego